was a village located in Kiso District, Nagano Prefecture, Japan.

On April 1, 2005, Narakawa was merged into the expanded city of Shiojiri.

As of October 1, 2004, the former village had an estimated population of 3,393. The total area was 117.82 km².

Geography
Surrounding municipalities
 Ina, Shiojiri
 Kiso District: Kiso, Hiyoshi
 Higashichikuma District: Asahi
 Kamiina District: Tatsuno, Minamiminowa

Sister cities
 Fukuroi (Shizuoka Prefecture) — Signed on October 28, 2001

Dissolved municipalities of Nagano Prefecture
Shiojiri, Nagano